Sharib Hashmi (born 25 January 1976) is an Indian actor, writer, producer and director who works in the Hindi cinema. He is best known for portraying J.K. Talpade in the Amazon Prime Video series The Family Man (2019-2021) and Sunny in Filmistaan.

Early life and education
Sharib Hashmi was born in Malad, Mumbai, into a middle-class family. His father, Z. A. Johar, was a noted film journalist. Sharib did his schooling from St. John's Model English High School and graduated from Bhavan's College in Mumbai, India.

Personal life
Sharib married Nasreen Hashmi on December 27, 2003. The couple have 2 children, a girl and a boy.

Career 
Sharib worked behind the scenes in MTV Roadies Season 2. 
In 2008, he appeared in Slumdog Millionaire, which became an Oscar-winning movie.

In 2012, he obtained a major role in Filmistaan, alongside Inaamulhaq and Kumud Mishra. He played a supporting role in Jab Tak Hai Jaan, which starred Shahrukh Khan, Anushka Sharma and Katrina Kaif.

Later, he worked on films like Badmashiyaan (2015), Phullu Phullu (2017), Vodka Diaries (2018), Batti GUI Meter Chalu (2018), Nakkash (2019), Ujda Chaman (2019), Darbaan (2020) and Vikram Vedha (2022).

Sharib Hashmi's other work has included the Amazon Prime production Blockbuster Series The Family Man  and Voot Select blockbuster Asur.

In 2020, he appeared in the television series A Viral Wedding, Scam 1992, and worked in numerous commercials, television web series and films.

Filmography

Films

Other credits

Short films

Television

Awards and nominations

References

External links
 
 
 

1976 births
Indian male film actors
Living people
Male actors in Hindi cinema
Indian male television actors
Indian male stage actors
Screen Awards winners
20th-century Indian male actors
21st-century Indian male actors